William Mortimer Clarence Denham (August 1888 – 21 September 1969) was a New Zealand politician of the Labour Party.

Biography

Early life and career
Denham was born in Sydney, New South Wales, Australia, in August 1888, and was educated both there and in Melbourne. He shifted to New Zealand in 1907 and settled in Invercargill working as a farmer and later as a tramway worker. For 12 years he was an employee representative to the Tramways Appeal Board.

Political career

Denham began his political career in local-body affairs. He was elected to the Invercargill City Council in 1928 and was also a member of the Southland Technical College Board.

He represented the Invercargill electorate in the House of Representatives from 1935 to 1946, when he was defeated. While an MP he legislated for the establishment of the Invercargill Licensing Trust in 1944 and advocated for a special fund for writers, resulting in the formation of the Literary Grants Advisory Board.

In 1947 he stood for the Invercargill mayoralty against incumbent Abraham Wachner. Denham polled respectably but was defeated by a margin of 997 votes.

Later life and death
Denham later became chairman of the Invercargill Savings Bank. He died on 21 September 1969 at the age of 81. He is buried at Invercargill's Eastern Cemetery, along with his wife Gwendolyn who died 1 January 1971, and his mother-in-law Ada Meadows.

Notes

References

1888 births
1969 deaths
Australian emigrants to New Zealand
Burials at Eastern Cemetery, Invercargill
Invercargill City Councillors
New Zealand Labour Party MPs
Members of the New Zealand House of Representatives
New Zealand MPs for South Island electorates
Unsuccessful candidates in the 1928 New Zealand general election
Unsuccessful candidates in the 1931 New Zealand general election
Unsuccessful candidates in the 1946 New Zealand general election
Unsuccessful candidates in the 1949 New Zealand general election
Unsuccessful candidates in the 1954 New Zealand general election